Kim Ji-young (born September 13, 1980), professionally known by the stage name Han Chae-young, is a South Korean actress. She first gained recognition as the antagonist in the television series Autumn in My Heart (2000) before gaining wider prominence as the titular character in Delightful Girl Choon-Hyang (2005). Her other roles include Only You (2005), Fireworks (2006), Boys Over Flowers (2009), A Man Called God (2010), and Pretty Man (2013).

Early life
Han Chae-young was born as Kim Ji-young in Daegu, South Korea, but her family soon immigrated to the United States and she spent her childhood years in a Chicago suburb, where she attended Glenbrook South High School. During one of her visits to Korea, she was reportedly discovered by a famed Korean comedian who suggested that she put her college plans on hold and try acting.

Career

2000–2004: Early career
Taking on the stage name Han Chae-young, she made her acting debut in 2000 with the horror film The Record.  Her role as the antagonist in the popular television melodrama Autumn in My Heart gave her more exposure, though she was criticized for her awkward acting skills.

She later gained the nickname "Barbie Doll of Korea," a reference to her tall, shapely proportions. Though this image would land her numerous commercial endorsements, her acting projects in the next few years saw Han typecast as an unapproachable beauty from a wealthy background.

2005–2008: Breakthrough
In 2005, Han achieved success with the South Korean romantic comedy television series Delightful Girl Choon-Hyang, playing the titular role of a smart, lively high school girl who matured into a self-sufficient woman. A modern-day retelling of the famous folktale Chunhyangjeon, the series averaged 24.3% in viewership ratings, placing first in its slot for several episodes.

Her next two roles saw her playing a single mother with culinary dreams in the television series Only You (2005) and a jilted girl looking for employment in Exhibition of Fireworks (2006). Both series underperformed and she reverted to a glamorous character for the couple-swapping film Love Now (2007). In 2006, she signed an exclusive contract with BH Entertainment owned by Lee Byung-hun, and became one of the 1st talents of the newly found agency; BH Entertainment also manages many actors including Go Soo, Jin Goo, and Han Hyo-joo.

Han surprised fans by acting on stage for the first time in Jang Jin's play Clumsy People, which had a sell-out theater run from December 7, 2007, to March 2, 2008. Later that year she released her clothing line Rachel Han's (taken from her American name), produced in conjunction with online retailer G-Market.

2009–2012: International debut
In 2009 she made a special guest appearance in the smash hit drama Boys Over Flowers and starred in the films Good Morning President alongside Jang Dong-gun and Girlfriends. She later stated that her character in Girlfriend resembled her real self the most and was also the role she said she "had the most fun playing." The horror film Soul Mates, a Korea-New Zealand co-production, was supposed to have been Han's English-language international debut, but the project was later cancelled.

After a lengthy hiatus from the small screen (her 2009 fashion drama Magazine Allo did not push through due to plagiarism charges), Han was cast as a down-to-earth rookie journalist in 2010's manhwa adaptation A Man Called God.  The ₩10 billion-budget action-romance series is based on the 1999 comic book of the same title by manhwa writer Park Bong-seong, and achieved higher than average ratings during its run.

She then played Lee Byung-hun's love interest in The Influence, an online mystery-fantasy movie about a love that transcends time and space. The English-speaking actress signed with agency Creative Artists Agency (CAA) that same year.

Considered a Korean Wave star due to the popularity of Choon-hyang, Han began expanding her career to the mainland Chinese market. She starred in the 2011 fantasy-comedy A Big Deal opposite Blue Lan, Leon Jay Williams, and Chapman To. She was also cast in a leading role in Chinese television drama Wu Xie Ke Ji Zhi Lan Se Meng Xiang (lit. "Dream in Blue") opposite Zhu Zi Xiao, which aired on Zhejiang TV in 2012.

2013–present
After being under BH Entertainment for six years, Han left after her contract expiration in 2013 and signed with SM C&C.

She returned to the small screen with the 2013 television series Ad Genius Lee Tae-baek, which is loosely based on internationally renowned advertising designer and social activist Jeseok Yi (a.k.a. Jeski), who wrote the 2010 book Ad Genius Lee Je-seok. The series also reunited Han with Jo Hyun-jae who previously worked together in the 2005 TV series Only You.  Her next series was Pretty Man, playing the glamorous, successful woman that the main character (played by Jang Keun-suk) pines after.  In 2015, Han began hosting her first variety show, Take Care of My Dressing Table, where professionals in the beauty industry such as makeup artists and hairdressers share their styling tips. But her career remained primarily in China, where Han filmed the web series Beauty Master, followed by the TV adaptation of the Chinese novel The Rebirth of a Celebrity Superstar.

Since 2017, she has been a cast member of KBS2's Sister's Slam Dunk, and made her singing debut as member of a temporary group called Unnies. In September 2017 Han returned to the big screen with the comedy film The Star Next Door, playing a star actress who has a teenage daughter (portrayed by Jin Ji-hee) that is kept a secret from the public.

In 2018, Han was cast in the MBC weekend drama A Promise with the Gods. This marks Han's first Korean drama appearance in four years.

In December 2022, Han signed with new agency J-Flex Entertainment.

Personal life
Han married Korean-American businessman Choi Dong-joon on June 2, 2007, at Hotel Shilla in Seoul. She gave birth to a son on August 28, 2013.

Filmography

Television series

Film

Variety show

Theater

Awards and nominations

References

External links

South Korean film actresses
South Korean television actresses
South Korean stage actresses
South Korean female idols
1980 births
Living people
Dongguk University alumni
South Korean emigrants to the United States